ICC U19 Cricket World Cup EAP Qualifier (formerly EAP Under-19 Cricket Trophy) is a regular cricket competition organised by ICC East Asia-Pacific (EAP) for the under-19 teams of its representative nations. The tournament acts as a qualifier for the Under-19 World Cup.

The tournament was first held in 2001, and has been held regularly since 2007. Prior to 2001, EAP teams could attempt to qualify for the World Cup via the Youth Asia Cup, an Asian Cricket Council (ACC) event.  In 2003 and 2005, a joint event was organised with the African Cricket Association.

Papua New Guinea have won the most editions of the tournament, with 6 titles, and also won the 2003 joint Africa/EAP tournament. Fiji (2015) and Japan (2019) are the only other tournament winners, while Vanuatu finished runner-up in four consecutive editions of the tournament, from 2007 to 2013. Two other EAP teams, Australia and New Zealand, are ICC full members, and hence qualify automatically for the World Cup.

History

Since its inception, the EAP U-19 Cricket Trophy has provided a chance for EAP teams to qualify for the U-19 World Cup. Prior to the initial 2001 competition, however, EAP teams qualified via the Youth Asia Cup. In the 1997 event, Papua New Guinea qualified alongside then associate side Bangladesh to qualify for the 1998 U-19 World Cup. No EAP sides qualified from the 1999 competition.

In the first EAP U-19 Trophy, only the two most long standing EAP members participated, Papua New Guinea and Fiji alongside ACC side Hong Kong. Papua New Guinea won the three team event and so qualified for their second U-19 World Cup in 2002.

During the interim years when an EAP competition was not organised, a joint qualification event with the African Cricket Association took place. Once again, only Fiji and Papua New Guinea participated from the EAP region and World Cup qualification was only achieved by Papua New Guinea for the 2004 U-19 World Cup.

With an increase of teams from the EAP region able to participate, a standalone EAP Trophy once again took place in 2007 with Papua New Guinea and Fiji joined by Vanuatu and Japan. By 2009 there were five teams with the inclusion of Indonesia. In 2007 only one team qualified but in 2009 two teams went through to a further stage of qualification, the Under-19 World Cup Qualifier.

In the 2020 Under-19 Cricket World Cup qualification, Papua New Guinea and Japan were undefeated going into the final game against each other. However, Papua New Guinea forfeited the match after Cricket PNG suspended eleven members of the squad due to breaching the team's code of conduct. Japan thus qualified for its first ever Under-19 World Cup.

Tournament results

Participating teams
Legend
 – Champions
 – Runners-up
 – Third place
Q – Qualified
* – Combined tournament with African members (not included in this table)
 — Hosts

Records
This section includes performances by EAP teams and players at the 2003 and 2005 combined Africa/EAP tournaments.
Highest team scores
 440/8 (50 overs) –  vs , 20 July 2007, at Independence Park, Port Vila.
 381/8 (50 overs) –  vs , 19 July 2007, at KaZaa Field, Port Vila.
 340/9 (50 overs) –  vs , 23 August 2001, at Nadi Muslim College, Nadi.
 334 all out (49.2 overs) –  vs , 19 August 2001, at Nadi Muslim College, Nadi.
 307/7 (50 overs) –  vs , 1 June 2009, at Colt Grounds, Port Moresby.

Lowest team scores
 23 all out (27.4 overs) –  vs , 7 February 2011, at Ron McMullin Oval, Maroochydore.
 32 all out (15.1 overs) –  vs , 2 July 2013, at John Blanck Oval, Maroochydore.
 32 all out (21.2 overs) –  vs , 1 June 2009, at Colt Ground, Port Moresby.
 34 all out (29 overs) –  vs , 19 July 2007, at KaZaa Field, Port Vila.
 35 all out (24 overs) –  vs , 22 July 2007, at Club Hippique Adventure Park, Port Vila.

Highest individual scores
 257 (145 balls) –  Josefa Rika, vs , 20 July 2007, at Independence Park, Port Vila.
 157 (89 balls) –  Andrew Mansale, vs , 19 July 2007, at KaZaa Field, Port Vila.
 142* (125 balls) –  Mahuru Dai, vs , 8 October 2003, at Windhoek.
 129 (156 balls) –  Colin Rika, vs , 21 August 2001, at Nadi Muslim College, Nadi.
 104* (84 balls) –  Norbert Kunia, vs , 23 August 2005, at Willowmoore Park, Benoni.

Best bowling figures
 6/3 (10 overs) –  Jaxies Samuel, vs , 7 February 2011, at Ron McMullin Oval, Maroochydore.
 6/13 (10 overs) –  Sekope Biauniceva, vs , 20 July 2007, at Independence Park, Port Vila.
 6/25 (10 overs) –  S. B. Tavokiti, vs , 5 October 2003, at Trans Namib Ground, Windhoek.
 5/5 (6 overs) –  Andrew Mansale, vs , 19 July 2007, at KaZaa Field, Port Vila.
 5/7 (8 overs) –  Patrick Matuataava, vs , 8 February 2011, at Kev Hackney Oval, Maroochydore.

See also

 World Cricket League EAP region

References

Under-19 regional cricket tournaments